Michael Daniels (13 October 1905 – 12 May 1995) was an Irish sportsperson.  He played hurling with his local club Army Metro and was a member of the Dublin senior inter-county team from 1930 until 1939.  Daniels captained Dublin to All-Ireland victory in 1938.

Playing career

Club

Daniels played his club hurling with his local club Army Metro and enjoyed much success.  He won his first senior county title in 1933 and added two more county medals to his collection in 1935 and 1938.

Inter-county

Daniels first came to prominence on the inter-county scene with Dublin in the early 1930s.  He made his debut in 1930 when he came on as a substitute in the All-Ireland final.  Dublin played Tipperary on that occasion, however, the victory went to the men from Tipp.

‘The Dubs’ reached the Leinster finals again in 1932 and 1933, however, Kilkenny emerged victorious on both occasions.  It was 1934 before Daniels won his first Leinster title as Dublin finally triumphed over Kilkenny.  The subsequent All-Ireland final saw Daniels’s side take on Limerick.  The game, however, ended in a draw – 2-7 to 3-4 – and both teams returned to Croke Park a month later for the replay.  In a high-scoring game Limerick sealed the victory on a score line of 5-2 to 2-6.

Dublin went into decline for the next few years; however, in 1938 ‘the Dubs’ were back with Daniels as captain.  That year he collected a second Leinster medal before later leading his team out in Croke Park for the All-Ireland final.  Waterford, who were playing in their first championship decider, provided the opposition on that occasion.  The Munster men got off to a good start, however, Dublin fought back.  A 2-5 to 1-6 victory gave Dublin the victory and gave Daniels an All-Ireland medal.

In 1939 Daniels was still captain as Dublin reached the final of the National Hurling League.  That game turned out to be a replay of the previous year’s All-Ireland final.  Once again, Waterford were defeated and Daniels added a National League medal to his collection.  It was to be his final victory with ‘the Dubs’ as he retired from inter-county hurling shortly afterwards.

Provincial

Daniels also lined out for Leinster in the inter-provincial hurling competition.  He captured a Railway Cup medal in 1936.

1905 births
1995 deaths
Army Metro hurlers
Dublin inter-county hurlers
Tipperary inter-county hurlers
Leinster inter-provincial hurlers
All-Ireland Senior Hurling Championship winners